Ntelle is a community council located in the Butha-Buthe District of Lesotho. Its population in 2006 was 5,233.

Villages
The community of Ntelle includes the villages of Ha 'Mantlobo, Ha Bulara, Ha Jane, Ha Katsi, Ha Konka, Ha Kopialla, Ha Lechesa, Ha Lepotisa, Ha Lethata, Ha Maama, Ha Majara, Ha Makhethe, Ha Maraisane, Ha Mohapinyane, Ha Moroko, Ha Motšoane, Ha Nkoe (Thoteng), Ha Nonyana, Ha Ntsane, Ha Phasekalise (Bongalla), Ha Puso, Ha Ratšele, Ha Sera, Ha Tlhoeli, Mafikeng, Mahaneng, Malehlakana, Mangoaboleng, Masaleng, Mashaeng, Mashaleng, Matebeleng, Matsekoane, Matsela, Phahameng, Phallang, Sekhutlong, Taung, Thibella and White City.

References

External links
 Google map of community villages

Populated places in Butha-Buthe District